County Bridge No. 101 is a historic stone arch bridge located in Valley Township, Chester County, Pennsylvania. It spans Brandywine Creek.  It has four stilted arch spans, each of which are 40-feet long.  The bridge was constructed in 1918.

It was listed on the National Register of Historic Places in 1988.

References 
 

Road bridges on the National Register of Historic Places in Pennsylvania
Bridges completed in 1918
Bridges in Chester County, Pennsylvania
National Register of Historic Places in Chester County, Pennsylvania
Stone arch bridges in the United States